The leader of the House is a position responsible for arranging government business in the Parliament of Singapore. The leader of the House initiate motions concerning the business of the House during parliamentary sittings, such as actions to be taken on procedural matters and extending sitting times. The incumbent leader of the House is Indranee Rajah, with Zaqy Mohamad serving as the deputy leader of the House.

List of leaders of the House

List of deputy leaders of the House

References

Government of Singapore